Sandro Kulenović (born 4 December 1999) is a Croatian professional footballer who plays as a striker for Lokomotiva, on loan from Dinamo Zagreb.

Club career
Kulenović was born in Zagreb in 1999. His father Almin, who hails from Bihać, is a former Bosnian international who has seven caps for Bosnia and Herzegovina. Kulenović joined the academy of Dinamo Zagreb in 2008. During the 2015–16 season, he played 27 times for the reserves, scoring 22 goals and adding 11 assists. On 7 June 2016, he moved abroad and joined the academy of Polish club Legia Warsaw on a three-year contract. On 22 July 2017, he was loaned out to the youth team of Italian club Juventus, but returned to his parent club in the following June.

On 10 July 2018, Kulenović made his first team debut, playing the last nine minutes of a 1–0 victory over Irish club Cork City in the UEFA Champions League.  On 22 August, he signed a three-year contract extension with the club. On 27 October, he scored his first goal for the club in a 1–1 league draw against Jagiellonia Białystok.

On 2 September 2019, Kulenović returned to Dinamo Zagreb, signing a long-term deal. He debuted on 21 September against Varaždin. However, after an unsuccessful season where he failed to scored a single goal, he was loaned out to Rijeka on 21 September 2020. On 24 September, in a Europa League third qualifying round against Kolos Kovalivka, he made his debut for Rijeka. The match went into extra time and, while the score was 1–0, Kulenović notably had an opportunity to set the score to 2–0; however, the ball stopped in a puddle of mud on the goal line as the pitch was soaking wet due to heavy rain. It was then netted in by teammate Franko Andrijašević. He scored his first goal for Rijeka on 4 October, a penalty kick in a 2–0 victory over Slaven Belupo. In the second half of the season, Kulenović fell out of favour with coach Simon Rožman, who left him out of the squad during the training ahead of the derby with Hajduk Split on 27 February 2021.

International career
Kulenović has been capped at the youth international level and also captained the Croatia under-16 team. He was part of Croatia's 23-man squads for UEFA Under-21 Euros 2019 and 2021.

Style of play
Kulenović plays as a typical number 9. Croatian journalists have often hailed him as "the new Mandžukić", whom he named his idol alongside Fernando Torres.

Career statistics

References

External links

1999 births
Living people
Footballers from Zagreb
Croatian people of Bosniak descent 
Croatian footballers
Croatian expatriate footballers
Croatia youth international footballers
Croatia under-21 international footballers
Association football forwards
Legia Warsaw players
GNK Dinamo Zagreb players
HNK Rijeka players
NK Lokomotiva Zagreb players
Ekstraklasa players
Croatian Football League players
Croatian expatriate sportspeople in Poland
Expatriate footballers in Poland